Al-Muḥāsibī (781-857 CE) was an Arab philosopher, and considered to be the founder of the Baghdad School of Islamic philosophy, and a teacher of the Sufi masters Junayd al-Baghdadi and Sirri Saqti.

His full name is Abu Abdullah Harith bin Asad bin Abdullah al-Anizi al-Basri hailed from the Arab Anazzah tribe. He was born in Basra in about 781. Muhasibi means self-inspection/audit. It was his characteristic property. He was a founder of Sufi doctrine, and influenced many subsequent theologians, such as al-Ghazali.

The author of approximately 200 works, he wrote about theology and Tasawwuf (Sufism), among them Kitab al-Khalwa and Kitab al-Ri`aya li-huquq Allah ("Obeying God's Permits").

Life
His parents left Basra for Baghdad shortly after his birth, perhaps inclined to the economic opportunities in the new capital. His father became wealthy, though al-Muhasibi refused it. Despite the affluent lifestyle available to him, he retained an ascetic quality from al-Hasan al-Basri. The Sufis of his time has taken on certain practices, such as wearing woolen clothing, reciting the Qur'an at night, and limiting the kind and quantity of food eaten. He saw that Sufi practices can help control the passions, but can also result in other problems like hypocrisy and pride. When outward piety becomes a part of one's image, it can mask hidden problems with the ego. Both the inner and outward states must be rectified. Constant self-examination (muhasabah) in anticipation of the Day of Judgement was his proposed method for developing awareness of the inner self and purifying the heart.

Al-Muhasibi later joined a group of scholars of theology, led by Abdullah ibn Kullāb (died 855). They criticized the Jahmis, Mu'tazilis, and Anthropomorphists. The Mu'tazilis argued that the Qur'an was created, while Ibn Kullab argued against the createdness of the Qur'an by introducing a distinction between the speech of God (kalam Allah) and its realization: God is eternally speaking (mutakallim), but he can only be mukallim, addressing Himself to somebody, if this addressee exists.

In 848 (or possibly 851), the caliph al-Mutawakkil ended the Mihna, and, two years later, banned the Mu'tazilites' theology.

In al-Khalwa, in a discourse on fear and hope:
Know that the first thing that corrects you and helps you correct others is renouncing this world. For renunciation is attained by realisation, and consideration is attained by reflection. For if you think of this world, you will not find it worth sacrificing your soul and faith for it. But you will find your soul worthier of honour by ridiculing this world. This world is abhorred of God almighty and the messengers. It is an abode of affliction and a station of foolishness. Be on your guard from it.

See also 
 Ibn Kullab
 Junayd of Baghdad
 List of Sufis

References

Further reading

External links
 Mu'atabah an-Nafs by Harith al-Muhasibi
 al-Ri'ayah Li'Huquq-il-lah by Harith al-Muhasibi
  Treatise of Faith by Imam Al Muhasibi (at-tawhid.net)

Shafi'is
Kullabis
Sunni Sufis
Sunni imams
Sunni Muslim scholars of Islam
9th-century Muslim theologians
Sufi teachers
Writers from Baghdad
8th-century Arabs
9th-century Arabs
781 births
857 deaths